Charm of Finches are an Australian duo consisting of Mabel and Ivy Windred-Wornes. The duo say "We write contemporary folk songs inspired by our personal experiences of love, grief and nature. We like to describe our music as contemporary chamber folk."

Background
Mabel and Ivy Windred-Wornes grew up in the Melbourne suburb of Northcote. As kids they listened to a lot of folk music around the house such as Americana and Appalachian mountain music as well as English and Celtic folk tunes. At the ages of eight and eleven, they busked  outside of the local vegetable shop and played songs by First Aid Kit. 

They went to Steiner School and took up learning stringed instruments (violin and cello), when they were eight years old. Mabel later taught herself how to play guitar and they started writing songs together.

Musical career
In 2014, at ages eleven and fourteen, the duo made their debut EP as part of a school project. Their friend Michael Johnson heard the songs and offered to record them in his home studio with Evripedes Evripidou and it became Home. In 2015, they won the Darebin Music Feast Songwriters’ Award.

In July 2016, the duo released their debut album, which was praised by Paul Gough of Radio National's Inside Sleeve as "stunning new folk".

In 2019, they released their second studio album Your Company.

At the start of 2020 they showcased at the Folk Alliance International Conference in New Orleans, US. They were one of 96 artists selected worldwide to participate in the first Global Music Match. Their album Your Company won Folk/Singer-Songwriter at the Independent Music Awards of 2020. 

In January 2021, it was announced that they duo had signed to New York label AntiFragile. AntiFragile's Tom Sarig said "I'm overjoyed to have signed Charm of Finches to AntiFragile Music, and we are so looking forward to releasing their next album in 2021."

In August 2021, they released "Canyon", the lead single from their third studio album Wonderful Oblivion, released on 22 October 2021.

Discography

Albums

Extended plays

Notes

Awards and nominations

Australian Music Prize
The Australian Music Prize (the AMP) is an annual award of $30,000 given to an Australian band or solo artist in recognition of the merit of an album released during the year of award. The commenced in 2005.

! 
|-
| 2020
| Your Company
| Australian Music Prize
| 
| 
|-

Independent Music Awards
The Independent Music Awards is a global community of indie artists, industry influencers and engaged fan. The awards commenced in 2002.

! 
|-
|rowspan=2| 2020
| Your Company
| Folk/Singer-Songwriter (album)
| 
|rowspan=2| 
|-
| "Fish in the Sea"
| Folk/Singer-Songwriter (song)
| 
|-

Music Victoria Awards
The Music Victoria Awards, are an annual awards night celebrating Victorian music. The commenced in 2005.

! 
|-
| 2020
| Your Company
| Best Folk or Roots Album
| 
| 
|-
| 2021
| Charm of Finches
| Best Folk Act
| 
|
|-
| 2022
| Charm of Finches
| Best Folk Work
| 
| 
|-

References

Australian girl groups
Sibling musical duos
Musical groups established in 2014
2014 establishments in Australia